SS Glenartney was a cargo steamship that was launched in Scotland in 1911 and sunk by a U-boat in the English Channel in 1918.

Building
In 1911 Charles Connell & Co built a pair of cargo ships for the Caledonia Steamship Company. Glenetive was built at Scotstoun, launched on 22 August and completed that September. Her sister ship Glenartney was built at Whiteinch, launched on 26 October and completed that December.

Dunsmuir and Jackson of Govan, Glasgow built a three-cylinder triple expansion steam engine for each ship. Glenartneys engine was rated at 536 NHP.

Glenartney was registered in Glasgow, her UK official number was 132995 and her code letters were HTWB.

Loss
In March 1915 Glenartney was en route from Bangkok to London with a cargo of rice and meal.

A torpedo boat rescued 39 survivors and landed them at Newhaven in England.

References

1911 ships
Maritime incidents in 1915
Ships built in Glasgow
Ships sunk by German submarines in World War I
Steamships of the United Kingdom
World War I merchant ships of the United Kingdom
World War I shipwrecks in the Atlantic Ocean